Saint Anne's Shrine is a Roman Catholic shrine in Isle La Motte, Vermont, on the shores of Lake Champlain.  The shrine is located several miles south of the Canada–US border, on Shrine Road, near U.S. Route 2.  The shrine is run by the Edmundite Fathers in cooperation with the Diocese of Burlington.  Daily mass, retreats and other services are offered in the summer.  The grounds feature an open-air chapel, a meeting center, gift shop and cafeteria, a grotto, numerous statues and a beach.

History
In 1666, a fort and a chapel were built on Isle La Motte to protect Montreal from attacks by the Iroquois Indians.  Both the fort and chapel were dedicated to Saint Anne, the mother of the Virgin Mary. In 1668, the bishop of Quebec, François de Laval, came to Isle La Motte to baptize a number of Iroquois to Christianity.  Even after the abandonment of the fort, the shrine continued to offer mass to worshipers.

Images

External links

 Official site
 Saint Anne's Shrine
 Welcome to Isle La Motte, address by Sen. Henry W. Hill, July 9, 1909.

Islands of Lake Champlain
 
Populated places in Grand Isle County, Vermont
Lake islands of Vermont
Islands of Grand Isle County, Vermont
Roman Catholic shrines in the United States